The 2017 United Kingdom general election in England was held on Thursday 8 June 2017 across 533 constituencies within England.

Results summary

Analysis

The Conservatives retained a majority of seats in England, though with a net loss of 23 seats. They also increased their share of the vote to their highest since 1987.

The Labour Party substantially increased their share of the vote and made gains for the first time since 2001, but did not overtake the Conservatives. Labour received its highest share of the vote in England since 1997.

The Liberal Democrats, led by Tim Farron saw their previous leader Nick Clegg lose his seat; as Sheffield Hallam was gained by the Labour candidate, Jared O'Mara. They also lost their by-election gain at Richmond Park to Zac Goldsmith of the Conservatives; whose resignation on 25 October 2016 triggered the by-election initially. They also gained some seats, including the recovery of Twickenham by former Business Secretary Sir Vince Cable who had lost it to the Conservatives two years previously. Cable succeeded Farron as party leader on 20 July 2017.

UKIP saw their share of the vote collapse to almost negligible levels. They failed to gain any new seats and their one success from 2015, Clacton, returned to Conservative control. Paul Nuttall resigned as party leader on 9 June 2017 after finishing in third place at Boston and Skegness.

The Green Party decreased its share of the vote and failed to make any gains, but retained Brighton Pavilion. The party deliberately chose not to contest many seats, in order to give Labour an increased chance of winning over Conservative candidates.

Regional results

Regional vote shares and changes are sourced from Britain Elects.

East Midlands

East of England

London

North East England

North West England

In Cheshire the 2015 result was reversed, with Labour winning seven seats and the Conservatives four. Crewe and Nantwich was a gain for Labour, with tutor and activist Laura Smith defeating children and families minister Edward Timpson. In Tatton, former chancellor George Osborne did not seek re-election, having become editor of the Evening Standard. He was succeeded by Esther McVey, who had been a junior DWP minister in the Cameron-Clegg coalition prior to her defeat in Wirral West in 2015. In Warrington South the care and support minister David Mowat was defeated by the borough's former mayor Faisal Rashid. City councillor and trade unionist Mike Amesbury gained Weaver Vale from Graham Evans.

South East England

Of the eight constituencies in Berkshire six were held by the Conservatives. The party leader and prime minister Theresa May was re-elected, as were justice minister Dr Phillip Lee, Asia minister Alok Sharma and former trade secretary Dr John Redwood. Labour held Slough for Tan Dhesi. Labour also gained Reading East, with former civil servant Matt Rodda defeating civil society minister Rob Wilson.

No seats changed allegiance in Buckinghamshire. Commons leader Dr David Lidington, veterans minister Lieutenant Colonel Mark Lancaster and former attorney-general Dominic Grieve were re-elected. John Bercow, speaker of the House of Commons, returned in Buckingham uncontested by the main political parties.

In Hampshire the Conservatives were successful in sixteen seats. DWP ministers Damian Hinds and Penny Mordaunt, May's own PPS George Hollingbery, Cabinet Office undersecretary Caroline Nokes and assistant whip Steve Brine were re-elected. Labour won two seats, with shadow energy minister Alan Whitehead holding Southampton Test and city councillor Stephen Morgan gaining Portsmouth South from Flick Drummond (giving that constituency its first Labour MP in its ninety-nine-year history).

Labour gained Canterbury, with former teaching assistant Rosie Duffield defeating Sir Julian Brazier. This ended the monopoly which the Conservatives had enjoyed across Kent since 2010. The rest of the seats held, with work & pensions secretary Damian Green securing re-election alongside sport minister Tracey Crouch, defence secretary Sir Michael Fallon and business secretary Greg Clark.

In Oxfordshire the Conservatives held four of the six seats including Witney, which had elected David Cameron two years prior. Labour held Oxford East, while Oxford West and Abingdon was a gain for the Liberal Democrats, with former teacher Layla Moran defeating public health undersecretary Nicola Blackwood.

For the fourth general election in a row the Conservatives made a clean sweep of Surrey. Prisons undersecretary Sam Gyimah, transport secretary Chris Grayling, deputy chief whip Anne Milton, chancellor Philip Hammond, health secretary Jeremy Hunt and former lord chancellor Michael Gove all held their seats here.

South West England

The combined representation of Labour and the Liberal Democrats doubled compared to 2015, but the Conservatives still had a landslide and also increased their vote share to an outright majority.

In Cornwall the Conservatives held all six constituencies, re-electing junior ministers George Eustice and Sarah Newton.

In Devon Labour made one gain in Plymouth Sutton and Devonport, trade unionist Luke Pollard defeating Oliver Colvile. They also held Exeter for the sixth consecutive time. The other ten constituencies were held by the Conservatives, including treasury minister Mel Stride and former FCO minister Sir Hugo Swire, who defeated a challenge by independent candidate Claire Wright in his East Devon constituency. The former armed forces minister Sir Nick Harvey attempted to regain the constituency of North Devon but the Conservative Peter Heaton-Jones held it by a margin of 4,332.

In Dorset all eight Conservative MPs were re-elected, including the counter-terrorism minister Tobias Ellwood and former Lancaster chancellor Sir Oliver Letwin.

The Conservatives held five seats in Gloucestershire, returning former chief whip Mark Harper. Labour gained Stroud, where Forest Green Rovers chairman David Drew defeated Neil Carmichael.

The five Somerset constituencies were all held by the Conservatives. Tessa Munt attempted unsuccessfully to regain Wells from James Heappey.

The Conservatives also held all seven seats in Wiltshire: Climate change minister Claire Perry was re-elected, as were DWP minister Justin Tomlinson and solicitor-general Robert Buckland.

West Midlands

The Conservatives increased their majority and Labour fell back slightly. Both parties increased their share of the popular vote. The Liberal Democrats and Greens failed to make any improvement on the 2015 result, while UKIP saw its support collapse.

In the ceremonial county of West Midlands Labour won twenty seats and the Conservatives won eight. Gisela Stuart retired and was succeeded in Birmingham Edgbaston by Sandwell councillor Preet Gill, making her the first female Sikh in the House of Commons. Work & Pensions spokesman Jack Dromey (husband of Harriet Harman) was re-elected in Birmingham Erdington. Shadow Europe minister Khalid Mahmood achieved a fifth term as MP for Birmingham Perry Barr. Second Church Estates Commissioner Dame Caroline Spelman was returned im Meriden. Business minister Margot James won a third term in Stourbridge. Former Chief Whip Andrew Mitchell held Sutton Coldfield. Walsall councillor Eddie Hughes defeated the long-serving Labour backbencher David Winnick on a 12-point swing. Tom Watson, deputy Labour leader, was re-elected in West Bromwich East and Valerie Vaz, shadow leader of the Commons, held Walsall South.

The Conservatives made a clean sweep of Worcestershire for the third consecutive election. Their six MPs included communities secretary Sajid Javid and three junior ministers (Harriett Baldwin, Robin Walker and Mark Garnier).

The Conservatives also maintained their sweep of Shropshire from 2015. Five MPs were elected, including Philip Dunne (incumbent Minister of State for Health) and Owen Paterson (who had headed the Northern Ireland Office and Defra under the coalition).

In Staffordshire the Conservatives won nine seats and Labour the remaining three. Junior whips Andrew Griffiths and Christopher Pincher secured re-election, as did their predecessor Michael Fabricant in Lichfield, while Chief Whip Gavin Williamson increased his majority by two thousand. The Moorlands gave a third term to culture secretary Karen Bradley. Conservative Jack Brereton defeated Rob Flello, ending sixty-seven years of Labour representation in Stoke-on-Trent South.

In Warwickshire the Labour party gained Warwick and Leamington (county councillor Matt Western defeated Chris White, ending seven years of Conservative ascendancy.) The Conservatives held the five other seats, electing attorney-general Jeremy Wright, DCLG minister Marcus Jones and PPS Mark Pawsey.

In Herefordshire Jesse Norman and Bill Wiggin were both returned to Parliament.

Yorkshire and the Humber

All seats in the region went to the two main parties: Labour increasing their dominance, the Conservatives falling back slightly, and the Liberal Democrats being swept away. UKIP had polled strongly in 2015 but this year declined to insignificance. The Green Party continued to have negligible presence.

All three Kingston-upon-Hull constituencies were held by Labour: Diana Johnson and Karl Turner were re-elected by large majorities, while former Home Secretary Alan Johnson retired and was replaced by Hessle town councillor Emma Hardy.

In the East Riding of Yorkshire, the four Conservative MPs (David Davis, Graham Stuart, Greg Knight and Andrew Percy) were all re-elected with substantially increased shares of the vote.

Labour made a clean sweep across South Yorkshire, holding the thirteen which they had already (including Doncaster North for former leader Ed Miliband and Doncaster Central for former Chief Whip Dame Rosie Winterton) as well as gaining Sheffield Hallam from the former Deputy Prime Minister Nick Clegg.

In West Yorkshire five Conservatives (Craig Whittaker, Alec Shelbrooke, Andrea Jenkyns, Stuart Andrew and Philip Davies) were re-elected. Two others (Jason McCartney and Kris Hopkins) were defeated by Labour, as was the only Liberal Democrat Greg Mulholland. Labour held the fourteen seats it had won in 2015, returning shadow Lord Chancellor Richard Burgon and leadership contender Yvette Cooper as well as actress Tracy Brabin who had been elected the previous autumn following the murder of Jo Cox.

No constituencies changed allegiance in North Yorkshire: Labour's Rachael Maskell was re-elected in York Central while all seven other seats were held by the Conservatives, including vice-chamberlain and junior whip Julian Smith and transport minister Andrew Jones.

In North and North East Lincolnshire Nic Dakin and Martin Vickers were both re-elected. Melanie Onn also won re-election in Great Grimsby.

Donations 

Electoral commission data shows that in 2017 Q2, total donations for each major political party, over £7,500, are as follows:

Endorsements

See also 
 2017 United Kingdom general election in Northern Ireland
 2017 United Kingdom general election in Scotland
 2017 United Kingdom general election in Wales

References

England
United Kingdom General Election Results in England, 2017
2017